The active laser medium (also called gain medium or lasing medium) is the source of optical gain within a laser.  The gain results from the stimulated emission of photons through electronic or molecular transitions to a lower energy state from a higher energy state previously populated by a pump source.

Examples of active laser media include:
 Certain crystals, typically doped with rare-earth ions (e.g. neodymium, ytterbium, or erbium) or transition metal ions (titanium or chromium); most often yttrium aluminium garnet (Y3Al5O12), yttrium orthovanadate (YVO4), or sapphire (Al2O3); and not often Caesium cadmium bromide (CsCdBr3) (Solid-state lasers)
 Glasses, e.g. silicate or phosphate glasses, doped with laser-active ions;
 Gases, e.g. mixtures of helium and neon (HeNe), nitrogen, argon, krypton, carbon monoxide, carbon dioxide, or metal vapors; (Gas lasers)
 Semiconductors, e.g. gallium arsenide (GaAs), indium gallium arsenide (InGaAs), or gallium nitride (GaN).
 Liquids, in the form of dye solutions as used in dye lasers.

In order to fire a laser, the active gain medium must be in a nonthermal energy distribution known as a population inversion.  The preparation of this state requires an external energy source and is known as laser pumping.  Pumping may be achieved with electrical currents (e.g. semiconductors, or gases via high-voltage discharges) or with light, generated by discharge lamps or by other lasers (semiconductor lasers).  More exotic gain media can be pumped by chemical reactions, nuclear fission, or with high-energy electron beams.

Example of a model of gain medium

The simplest model of optical gain in real systems includes just two, energetically well separated, groups of sub-levels. Within each sub-level group, fast transitions ensure that thermal equilibrium is reached quickly. Stimulated emissions between upper and lower groups, essential for gain, require the upper levels to be more populated than the corresponding lower ones. This is more readily achieved if unstimulated transition rates between the two groups are slow, i.e. the upper levels are metastable. Population inversions are more easily produced when only the lowest sublevels are occupied, requiring either low temperatures or well energetically split groups. 

In the case of amplification of optical signals, the lasing frequency is called signal frequency. If the externally provided energy required for the signal's amplification is optical, it would necessarily be at the same or higher pump frequency.

Cross-sections
 Have  be concentration of active centers in the solid-state lasers.
 Have  be concentration of active centers in the ground state.
 Have  be concentration of excited centers.
 Have .

 is rate of the spontaneous decay of the upper level.

Then, the kinetic equation for relative populations can be written as follows:

,

However, these equations keep .

The absorption  at the pump frequency and the gain  at the signal frequency can be written 
as follows:

,
.

Steady-state solution
In many cases the gain medium works in a continuous-wave or quasi-continuous regime, causing the time derivatives of populations to be negligible.

The steady-state solution can be written:

, 

The dynamic saturation intensities can be defined:

,
.

The absorption at strong signal:
.

The gain at strong pump:
,
where 
is determinant of cross-section.

Gain never exceeds value , and absorption never exceeds value .

At given intensities ,   of pump and signal, the gain and absorption
can be expressed as follows:

,
,

where 
, 
, 
, 
 .

Identities
The following identities take place:
, 

The state of gain medium can be characterized with a single parameter, such as population of the upper level, gain or absorption.

Efficiency of the gain medium
The efficiency of a gain medium can be defined as
.

Within the same model, the efficiency can be expressed as follows:
.

For the efficient operation both intensities, pump and signal should exceed their saturation intensities;

The estimates above are valid for a medium uniformly filled with pump and signal light.  Spatial hole burning may slightly reduce the efficiency because some regions are pumped well, but the pump is not efficiently withdrawn by the signal in the nodes of the interference of counter-propagating waves.

See also
Population inversion
Laser construction
Laser science
List of laser articles
List of laser types

References and notes

External links
Gain media Encyclopedia of Laser Physics and Technology

 
Laser science